Landolina is a surname. Notable people with the surname include:

Emiliano Landolina (born 1986), Italian footballer
Giovanni Battista Landolina, Sicilian landowner and intellectual 
Joe Landolina (born 1993), biomedical engineer